Buzdar may refer to:
 Buzdar (tribe), a clan of the Baloch people of Pakistan
 Sardar Usman Buzdar, Pakistani politician, incumbent Chief Minister of Punjab
 Sardar Fateh Buzdar, Pakistani politician, former member of the Punjab Assembly

See also 
 Basti Buzdar, a town in Punjab, Pakistan